Herb Keinon is an American-born Israeli journalist and columnist for The Jerusalem Post. Since 2000 he has served as the publication's diplomatic correspondent  Keinon is often invited to speak on issues concerning Israeli society, security and Middle Eastern politics.

Biography
Herb Keinon was born in Denver. He earned a Bachelor of Arts in political science from the University of Colorado, Boulder, and a Master of Arts in journalism from the University of Illinois Urbana-Champaign. He lives in Ma'ale Adumim with his wife and four children.

Publications

References

American emigrants to Israel
Israeli Jews
Israeli journalists
Living people
Writers from Denver
University of Colorado alumni
University of Illinois Urbana-Champaign College of Media alumni
The Jerusalem Post people
Year of birth missing (living people)